They May Not Marry is a 1929 German silent film directed by Carl Heinz Rudolph and starring Victor Costa, Olga Engl, and Günther Laufer.

The film's sets were designed by Karl Machus.

Cast

References

Bibliography

External links

1929 films
Films of the Weimar Republic
German silent feature films
Films directed by Carl Heinz Rudolph
German black-and-white films